The history of African Americans in Chicago or Black Chicagoans dates back to Jean Baptiste Point du Sable’s trading activities in the 1780s. Du Sable, the city's founder, was Haitian of African and French descent. Fugitive slaves and freedmen established the city's first black community in the 1840s. By the late 19th century, the first black person had been elected to office.

The Great Migrations from 1910 to 1960 brought hundreds of thousands of africans from the South to Chicago, where they became an urban population.  They created churches, community organizations, businesses, music, and literature.  African Americans of all classes built a community on the South Side of Chicago for decades before the Civil Rights Movement, as well as on the West Side of Chicago.  Residing in segregated communities, almost regardless of income, the Black residents of Chicago aimed to create communities where they could survive, sustain themselves, and have the ability to determine for themselves their own course in the History of Chicago.

The black population in Chicago has been shrinking. Many black Chicagoans have moved to the suburbs or Southern cities such as Atlanta, Dallas, and Houston, Birmingham, Memphis, and Jackson.

History

Beginnings

Jean Baptiste Point du Sable was a Haitian of French and African descent.

Although du Sable's settlement was established in the 1780s, African Americans would only become established as a community in the 1840s, with the population reaching 1,000 by 1860. Much of this population consisted of escaped slaves from the Upper South. Following the end of Reconstruction in 1877, African Americans flowed from the Deep South into Chicago, raising the population from approximately 4,000 in 1870 to 15,000 in 1890.

In 1853, John A. Logan helped pass a law to prohibit all African Americans, including freedmen, from settling in the state. However, in 1865, the state repealed its "Black Laws" and became the first to ratify the 13th Amendment, partly due to the efforts of John and Mary Jones, a prominent and wealthy activist couple.

Especially after the Civil War, Illinois had some of the most progressive anti-discrimination legislation in the nation. School segregation was first outlawed in 1874, and segregation in public accommodations was first outlawed in 1885. In 1870, Illinois extended voting rights to African-American men for the first time, and in 1871, John Jones, a tailor and Underground Railroad station manager who successfully lobbied for the repeal of the state's Black Laws, became the first African-American elected official in the state, serving as a member of the Cook County Commission. By 1879, John W. E. Thomas of Chicago became the first African American elected to the Illinois General Assembly, beginning the longest uninterrupted run of African-American representation in any state legislature in U.S. history. After the Great Chicago Fire, Chicago mayor Joseph Medill appointed the city's first black fire company of nine men and the first black police officer.

Great Migration

As the 20th century began, southern states succeeded in passing new constitutions and laws that disfranchised most blacks and many poor whites.  Deprived of the right to vote, they could not sit on juries or run for office. They were subject to discriminatory laws passed by white legislators, including racial segregation of public facilities. Segregated education for black children and other services were consistently underfunded in a poor, agricultural economy. As white-dominated legislatures passed Jim Crow laws to re-establish white supremacy and create more restrictions in public life, violence against blacks increased, with lynchings used as extrajudicial enforcement. In addition, the boll weevil infestation ruined much of the cotton industry. Voting with their feet, blacks started migrating out of the South to the North, where they could live more freely, get their children educated, and get new jobs.

Industry buildup for World War I pulled thousands of workers to the North, as did the rapid expansion of railroads, and the meatpacking and steel industries. Between 1915 and 1960, hundreds of thousands of black southerners migrated to Chicago to escape violence and segregation, and to seek economic freedom. They went from being a mostly rural population to one that was mostly urban. "The migration of African Americans from the rural south to the urban north became a mass movement." The Great Migration radically transformed Chicago, both politically and culturally.

From 1910 to 1940, most African Americans who migrated north were from rural areas. They had been chiefly sharecroppers and laborers, although some were landowners pushed out by the boll weevil disaster. After years of underfunding of public education for blacks in the South, they tended to be poorly educated, with relatively low skills to apply to urban jobs.  Like the European rural immigrants, they had to rapidly adapt to a different urban culture.  Many took advantage of better schooling in Chicago and their children learned quickly.  After 1940, when the second larger wave of migration started, black migrants tended to be already urbanized, from southern cities and towns.  They were the most ambitious, better educated with more urban skills to apply in their new homes.

The masses of new migrants arriving in the cities captured public attention.  At one point in the 1940s, 3,000 African Americans were arriving every week in Chicago—stepping off the trains from the South and making their ways to neighborhoods they had learned about from friends and the Chicago Defender.  The Great Migration was charted and evaluated. Urban white northerners started to get worried, as their neighborhoods rapidly changed. At the same time, recent and older ethnic immigrants competed for jobs and housing with the new arrivals, especially on the South Side, where the steel and meatpacking industries had the most numerous working-class jobs.

With Chicago's industries steadily expanding, opportunities opened up for new migrants, including Southerners, to find work. The railroad and meatpacking industries recruited black workers. Chicago's African-American newspaper, the Chicago Defender, made the city well known to southerners.  It sent bundles of papers south on the Illinois Central trains, and African-American Pullman Porters would drop them off in Black towns. "Chicago was the most accessible northern city for African Americans in Mississippi, Louisiana, Texas, and Arkansas." They took the trains north. "Then between 1916 and 1919, 50,000 blacks came to crowd into the burgeoning black belt, to make new demands upon the institutional structure of the South Side."

1919 race riot
The Chicago race riot of 1919 was a violent racial conflict started by white Americans against black Americans that began on the South Side on July 27 and ended on August 3, 1919. During the riot, 38 people died (23 black and 15 white). Over the week, injuries attributed to the episodic confrontations stood at 537, with two thirds of the injured being black and one third white, and approximately 1,000 to 2,000, most of whom were black, lost their homes. Due to its sustained violence and widespread economic impact, it is considered the worst of the scores of riots and civil disturbances across the nation during the "Red Summer" of 1919, so named because of the racial and labor violence and fatalities.

Segregation

The increasingly large black population in Chicago (40,000 in 1910, and 278,000 in 1940) faced some of the same discrimination as they had in the South.  It was hard for many blacks to find jobs and find decent places to live because of the competition for housing among different ethnic groups at a time when the city was expanding in population so dramatically. At the same time that blacks moved from the South in the Great Migration, Chicago had recently received hundreds of thousands of immigrants from southern and eastern Europe. The groups competed with each other for working-class wages.

Though other techniques to maintain housing segregation had been used, such as redlining and exclusive zoning to single-family housing, by 1927 the political leaders of Chicago began to adopt racially restrictive covenants. The Chicago Real Estate Board promoted a racially restrictive covenant to YMCAs, churches, women's clubs, parent teacher associations, Kiwanis clubs, chambers of commerce and property owners' associations. At one point, as much as 80% of the city's area was included under restrictive covenants.

The Supreme Court of the United States in Shelley v. Kraemer ruled in 1948 that racially restrictive covenants were unconstitutional, but this did not quickly solve blacks' problems with finding adequate housing.  Homeowners' associations discouraged members from selling to black families, thus maintaining residential segregation. European immigrants and their descendants competed with African Americans for limited affordable housing, and those who didn't get the house lived on the streets.

In a succession common to most cities, many middle and upper-class whites were the first to move out of the city to new housing, aided by new commuter rail lines and the construction of new highway systems.  Later arrivals, ethnic whites and African-American families occupied the older housing behind them. The white residents who had been in the city longest were the ones most likely to move to the newer, most expensive housing, as they could afford it. After 1945, the early white residents (many Irish immigrants and their descendants) on the South Side began to move away under pressure of new migrants and with newly expanding housing opportunities. African Americans continued to move into the area, which had become the black capital of the country. The South Side became predominantly black, and the Black Belt was solidified.

Social and economic conditions

Housing

Between 1900 and 1910, the African-American population rose rapidly in Chicago. White hostility and population growth combined to create the ghetto on the South Side. Nearby were areas dominated by ethnic Irish, who were especially territorial in defending against incursions into their areas by any other groups. Most of this large population was composed of migrants. In 1910 more than 75 percent of blacks lived in predominantly black sections of the city. The eight or nine neighborhoods that had been set as areas of black settlement in 1900 remained the core of the Chicago African-American community. The Black Belt slowly expanded as African Americans, despite facing violence and restrictive covenants, pushed forward into new neighborhoods. As the population grew, African Americans became more confined to a delineated area, instead of spreading throughout the city. When blacks moved into mixed neighborhoods, ethnic white hostility grew. After fighting over the area, often whites left the area to be dominated by blacks. This is one of the reasons the black belt region started.

The Black Belt of Chicago was the chain of neighborhoods on the South Side of Chicago where three-quarters of the city's African-American population lived by the mid-20th century. In the early 1940s whites within residential blocks formed "restrictive covenants" that served as legal contracts restricting individual owners from renting or selling to black people. The contracts limited the housing available to black tenants, leading to the accumulation of black residents within The Black Belt, one of the few neighborhoods open to black tenants. The Black Belt was an area that stretched 30 blocks along State Street on the South Side and was rarely more than seven blocks wide. With such a large population within this confined area, overcrowding often led to numerous families living in old and dilapidated buildings. The South Side's "black belt" also contained zones related to economic status. The poorest residents lived in the northernmost, oldest section of the black belt, while the elite resided in the southernmost section. In the mid-20th century, as African Americans across the United States struggled against the economic confines created by segregation, black residents within the Black Belt sought to create more economic opportunity in their community through the encouragement of local black businesses and entrepreneurs. During this time, Chicago was the capital of Black America. Many African Americans who moved to the Black Belt area of Chicago were from the Southeastern region of the United States.

Immigration to Chicago was another pressure of overcrowding, as primarily lower-class newcomers from rural Europe also sought cheap housing and working class jobs.  More and more people tried to fit into converted "kitchenette" and basement apartments.  Living conditions in the Black Belt resembled conditions in the West Side ghetto or in the stockyards district.  Although there were decent homes in the Negro sections, the core of the Black Belt was a slum. A 1934 census estimated that black households contained 6.8 people on average, whereas white households contained 4.7.  Many blacks lived in apartments that lacked plumbing, with only one bathroom for each floor.  With the buildings so overcrowded, building inspections and garbage collection were below the minimum mandatory requirements for healthy sanitation.  This unhealthiness increased the threat of disease. From 1940 to 1960, the infant death rate in the Black Belt was 16% higher than the rest of the city.

Crime in African-American neighborhoods was a low priority to the police. Associated with problems of poverty and southern culture, rates of violence and homicide were high. Some women resorted to prostitution to survive. Both low life and middle-class strivers were concentrated in a small area.

In 1946, the Chicago Housing Authority (CHA) tried to ease the pressure in the overcrowded ghettos and proposed to put public housing sites in less congested areas in the city. The white residents did not take to this very well, so city politicians forced the CHA to keep the status quo and develop high rise projects in the Black Belt and on the West Side. Some of these became notorious failures. As industrial restructuring in the 1950s and later led to massive job losses, residents changed from working-class families to poor families on welfare.

As of May 2016 violence within some Chicago neighborhoods prompted black middle-class people to move to the suburbs.

Culture
Between 1916 and 1920, almost 50,000  Black Southerners moved to Chicago, which profoundly shaped the city's development. Growth increased even more rapidly after 1940. In particular, the new citizens caused the growth of local churches, businesses and community organizations. A new musical culture arose, fed by all the traditions along the Mississippi River. The population continued to increase with new migrants, with the most arriving after 1940.

The black arts community in Chicago was especially vibrant. The 1920s were the height of the Jazz Age, but music continued as the heart of the community for decades. Nationally renowned musicians rose within the Chicago world. Along the Stroll, a bright-light district on State Street, jazz greats like Louis Armstrong, Duke Ellington, Cab Calloway, Bessie Smith and Ethel Waters headlined at nightspots including the Deluxe Cafe.

The literary creation of Black Chicago residents from 1925 to 1950 was also prolific, and the city's Black Renaissance rivaled that of the Harlem Renaissance. Prominent writers included Richard Wright, Willard Motley, William Attaway, Frank Marshall Davis, St. Clair Drake, Horace R. Cayton, Jr., and Margaret Walker. Chicago was home to writer and poet Gwendolyn Brooks, known for her portrayals of Black working-class life in crowded tenements of Bronzeville. These writers expressed the changes and conflicts blacks found in urban life and the struggles of creating new worlds. In Chicago, black writers turned away from the folk traditions embraced by Harlem Renaissance writers, instead adopting a grittier style of "literary naturalism" to depict life in the urban ghetto. The classic Black Metropolis, written by St. Clair Drake and Horace R. Cayton, Jr., exemplified the style of the Chicago writers. Today it remains the most detailed portrayal of Black Chicago in the 1930s and 1940s.

From 2008 to the present, the West Side Historical Society under the guidance of Rickie P. Brown Sr. began to document the rich history of the West Side of Chicago. Their research provided proof of the Austin community having the largest population of Blacks in the city of Chicago. This proved that the largest population of blacks are on its west side, when factoring in the Near West Side, North Lawndale, West Humboldt Park, Garfield Park, and Austin communities as well. Their efforts to build a museum on the west side and continuing to bring awareness to Juneteenth as a national holiday was rewarded with a proclamation in 2011 by Governor Pat Quinn.

Business
Chicago's black population developed a class structure, composed of a large number of domestic workers and other manual labourers, along with a small, but growing, contingent of middle-and-upper-class business and professional elites. In 1929, black Chicagoans gained access to city jobs, and expanded their professional class. Fighting job discrimination was a constant battle for African Americans in Chicago, as foremen in various companies restricted the advancement of black workers, which often kept them from earning higher wages. In the mid-20th century, blacks began slowly moving up to better positions in the work force.

The migration expanded the market for African-American business. "The most notable breakthrough in black business came in the insurance field." There were four major insurance companies founded in Chicago. Then, in the early 20th century, service establishments took over. The African-American market on State Street during this time consisted of barber shops, restaurants, pool rooms, saloons, and beauty salons. African Americans used these trades to build their own communities. These shops gave the blacks a chance to establish their families, earn money, and become an active part of the community.

Politics

With a growing base and strong leadership in machine politics, Blacks began to win elective office in local and state government.  The first blacks had been elected to office in Chicago in the late 19th century, decades before the Great Migrations.  Chicago elected the first post-Reconstruction African-American member of Congress. He was Republican Oscar Stanton De Priest, in Illinois's 1st congressional district (1929-1935). The district has continuously elected African-Americans to the office ever since. The Chicago area has elected 18 African Americans to the House of Representatives, more than any state. William L. Dawson represented the Black Belt in Congress from 1943 to his death in office in 1970. He started as a Republican but switched to the Democrats like most of his constituents in the late 1930s. In 1949, he became the first African American to chair a congressional committee.

Chicago is home to three of eight African-American United States senators who have served since Reconstruction, who are all Democrats: Carol Moseley Braun (1993–1999), Barack Obama (2005–2008), and Roland Burris (2009–2010). 

Barack Obama moved from the Senate to the White House in 2008.

Electing a Black mayor in 1983

In the February 22, 1983, the democrats were split three ways. On the North and Northwest Sides, the incumbent mayor Jane Byrne led and future mayor Richard M. Daley, son of the late Mayor Richard J. Daley, finished a close second. the Black leader Harold Washington had massive majorities on the South and West Sides.  Southwest Side voters overwhelmingly supported Daley. Washington won with 37% of the vote, versus 33% for Byrne and 30% for Daley. Although winning the Democratic primary was normally considered tantamount to election in heavily Democratic Chicago, after his primary victory Washington found that his Republican opponent, former state legislator Bernard Epton was supported by many high-ranking Democrats and their ward organizations.

Epton's campaign referred to, among other things, Washington's conviction for failure to file income tax returns (he had paid the taxes, but had not filed a return). Washington, on the other hand, stressed reforming the Chicago patronage system and the need for a jobs program in a tight economy. In the April 12, 1983, mayoral general election, Washington defeated Epton by 3.7%, 51.7% to 48.0%, to become mayor of Chicago. Washington was sworn in as mayor on April 29, 1983, and resigned his Congressional seat the following day.

Achievements
In the early 20th century many prominent African Americans were Chicago residents, including Republican and later Democratic congressman William L. Dawson (America's most powerful black politician) and boxing champion Joe Louis. America's most widely read black newspaper, the Chicago Defender, was published there and circulated in the South as well.

After long efforts, in the late 1930s, workers organized across racial lines to form the United Meatpacking Workers of America. By then, the majority of workers in Chicago's plants were black, but they succeeded in creating an interracial organizing committee. It succeeded in organizing unions both in Chicago and Omaha, Nebraska, the city with the second largest meatpacking industry. This union belonged to the Congress of Industrial Organizations (CIO), which was more progressive than the American Federation of Labor. They succeeded in lifting segregation of job positions. For a time, workers achieved living wages and other benefits, leading to blue collar middle-class life for decades. Some blacks were also able to move up the ranks to supervisory and management positions. The CIO also succeeded in organizing Chicago's steel industry.

Recent decline 
A recent report from the Chicago Tribune said thousands of black families have left Chicago in the past decade, lowering the black population by about 10%. Politico reported that Chicago's once wealthy black community has dramatically declined with the shuttering of many black-owned companies. Many blacks leaving Chicago are now recently moving to cities in the U.S. South, including Atlanta, Charlotte, Dallas, Houston, Little Rock, New Orleans, Memphis and San Antonio.

Notable people

 Bernie Mac 
 Michelle Obama
 Barack Obama
 Jesse Jackson
 Dick Gregory
 Dwyane Wade
 Derrick Rose
 Kanye West
 Tim Hardaway
 Anthony Davis
 Chance the Rapper
 Rhymefest
 Chief Keef
 Redd Foxx
 Sam Cooke
 Earth, Wind, and Fire
 R. Kelly
 Jennifer Hudson
 Shonda Rhimes
 Muhammad Ali
 Curtis Mayfield
 Minnie Riperton
 Louis Armstrong
 Muddy Waters
 Ida B Wells
 Emmett Till
 Lil Durk
 King Von
 G Herbo
 Lil Bibby
 Juice WRLD
 Polo G
 Dreezy
 Cupcakke
 Buddy Guy
 Nat King Cole
 Harold Washington
 Lupe Fiasco
 Twista
 Common
 Chaka Khan
 Keke Palmer
 Noname
 Dantrell Davis

See also

African Americans in New York City
History of African Americans in Philadelphia
History of African Americans in Detroit
History of African Americans in Boston
African Americans in Baltimore

Chicago Black Renaissance
Chicago State University
Chicago Race Riot of 1919
Great Migration (African American)
Second Great Migration (African American)
History of Chicago
Political history of Chicago

Demographics of Chicago
Ethnic groups in Chicago
George Floyd protests in Chicago
Puerto Ricans in Chicago
Mexicans in Chicago
Romani people in Chicago
Italians in Chicago
Koreans in Chicago
Germans in Chicago
Czechs in Chicago
Bosnians in Chicago
Swedes in Chicago
Japanese in Chicago
Indians in Chicago
History of the Jews in Chicago

References

Further reading
 Anderson, Alan B., and George W. Pickering. Confronting the Color Line: The Broken Promise of Civil Rights Movements in Chicago (U of Georgia Press, 1986).
 Balto, Simon. Occupied Territory: Policing Black Chicago from Red Summer to Black Power (UNC Press Books, 2019).

 Best, Wallace. "Black Belt," in Encyclopedia of Chicago, 2007; p. 140.
 Best, Wallace D. Passionately Human, No Less Divine: Religion and Culture in Black Chicago, 1915-1952. (Princeton University Press, 2007: , 2013). Info page.
 Blair, Cynthia M. I've got to make my livin': Black women's sex work in turn-of-the-century Chicago (U of Chicago Press, 2018); early 1900s

 Bowly, Devereaux, Jr. The Poorhouse: Subsidized Housing in Chicago, 1895–1976 (Southern Illinois UP,  1978).
 Branch, Taylor. Pillar of Fire: America in the King Years, 1964–1965 (1998). includes  Martin Luther King'r ole in Chicago
 Cohen, Adam, and Elizabeth Taylor. American Pharaoh: Mayor Richard J. Daley-his battle for Chicago and the nation (2001)
 Coit, Jonathan S., "'Our Changed Attitude': Armed Defense and the New Negro in the 1919 Chicago Race Riot", Journal of the Gilded Age and Progressive Era 11 (April 2012), 225–56.
 

 Danns, Dionne. "Policy implications for school desegregation and school choice in Chicago."  Urban Review 50 (2018): 584-603.
 Dolinar, Brian (ed.), The Negro in Illinois. The WPA Papers, University of Chicago Press, cloth: 2013, ; paper, : 2015. Produced by a special division of the Illinois Writers' Project, part of the Federal Writers' Project, one of President Roosevelt's Works Progress Administration programs of the 1930s, with black writers living in Chicago during the 1930s, including Richard Wright, Margaret Walker, Katherine Dunham, Fenton Johnson, Frank Yerby, and Richard Durham.
 Drake, St. Clair, and Horace Cayton. Black Metropolis: A Study in Negro Life in a Northern City (1945) a famous scholarly study. online
 Frady, Marshall. Jesse: The Life and Pilgrimage of Jesse Jackson (1996)
 Fremon, David. Chicago Politics Ward by Ward (Indiana University Press, 1988).
 Garrow, David J. ed. Chicago 1966: Open Housing Marches, Summit Negotiations, and Operation Breadbasket (1989).
 Garb, Margaret. Freedom's Ballot: African American Political Struggles in Chicago from Abolition to the Great Migration. (University of Chicago Press, 2014)
 Gordon, Rita Werner. "The change in the political alignment of Chicago's Negroes during the New Deal." Journal of American History 56.3 (1969): 584-603.
 Gosnell, Harold F. "The Chicago 'Black belt' as a political battleground." American Journal of Sociology 39.3 (1933): 329-341.
 Gosnell, Harold F. Negro Politicians; The Rise of Negro Politics in Chicago (University of Chicago Press. 1935). online; also see  online review
 Green, Adam. Selling the Race: Culture, Community, and Black Chicago, 1940-1955. (University of Chicago Press, 2009)
 Grimshaw, William J. Bitter Fruit: Black Politics and the Chicago Machine, 1931–1991 (University of Chicago Press, 1992).
 Grossman, James R. Land of hope: Chicago, black southerners, and the great migration (University of Chicago Press, 1991)
 Halpern, Rick. Down on the Killing Floor: Black and White Workers in Chicago's Packinghouses, 1904-54 (University of Illinois Press, 1997).
 Helgeson, Jeffrey. Crucibles of Black Empowerment: Chicago's Neighborhood Politics from the New Deal to Harold Washington. Chicago: University of Chicago Press, 2014, .
 Hirsch, Arnold Richard. Making the Second Ghetto: Race and Housing in Chicago 1940-1960. (U of Chicago Press, 1998)
 Hutchison, Ray. "Where is the Chicago Ghetto?." in The Ghetto (Routledge, 2018) pp. 293-326.
 Kenney, William Howland. Chicago jazz: A cultural history, 1904-1930 (Oxford University Press, 1993)
 Kimble Jr., Lionel. A New Deal for Bronzeville: Housing, Employment, and Civil Rights in Black Chicago, 1935–1955 (Southern Illinois University Press, 2015). xiv, 200 pp.
 Kleppner, Paul. Chicago Divided: The Making of a Black Mayor (Northern Illinois University Press, 1985); 1983 election of Harold Washington
 Knupfer, Anne Meis. "'Toward a Tenderer Humanity and a Nobler Womanhood': African-American Women's Clubs in Chicago, 1890 to 1920." Journal of Women's History 7#3 (1995): 58–76.
 Knupfer, Anne Meis. The Chicago Black Renaissance and women's activism (U of Illinois Press, 2023.
 Lemann, Nicholas. The Promised Land: The Great Migration and How It Changed America (1991).
 Logan, John R., Weiwei Zhang, and Miao David Chunyu. "Emergent ghettos: black neighborhoods in New York and Chicago, 1880–1940." American Journal of Sociology 120.4 (2015): 1055-1094. online

 McClelland, Ted. Young Mr. Obama: Chicago and the making of a Black president (2010) online
 McGreevy, John T. Parish Boundaries: The Catholic Encounter with Race in the TwentiethCentury Urban North (University of Chicago Press, 1996). excerpt
 Manning, Christopher. "African Americans," in Encyclopedia of Chicago. (2007); p. 27+.
 Naqvi, S. Kaazim. Chicago Muslims and the Transformation of American Islam: Immigrants, African Americans, and the Building of the American Ummah (Rowman & Littlefield, 2019).

 Philpott, Thomas Lee. The Slum and the Ghetto: Neighborhood Deterioration and Middle Class Reform, Chicago, 1880–1930 (Oxford  UP, 1978).
 Pickering, George W. Confronting the Color Line: The Broken Promise of the Civil Rights Movement in Chicago (U of Georgia Press, 1986).
 Pinderhughes, Dianne Marie. Race and ethnicity in Chicago politics: A reexamination of pluralist theory (U of Illinois Press, 1987)
 Reed, Christopher. The Chicago NAACP and the Rise of the Black Professional Leadership, 1910–1966 (Indiana University Press, 1997).
 Rivlin, Gary. Fire on the prairie: Chicago's Harold Washington and the politics of race (Holt, 1992)
 Rocksborough-Smith, Ian. Black public history in Chicago: Civil rights activism from World War II into the Cold War (U of Illinois Press, 2018).
 Rocksborough-Smith, Ian. "Margaret T.G. Burroughs and Black Public History in Cold War Chicago". The Black Scholar, (2011), Vol. 41(3), pp. 26–42.
 Schlabach, Elizabeth Schroeder. Dream Books and Gamblers: Black Women's Work in Chicago's Policy Game (U  of Illinois Press, 2022).
 Smith, Preston H. Racial democracy and the Black metropolis: Housing policy in postwar Chicago (U of Minnesota Press, 2012).
 Smith, Preston H. "The Chicago School of Human Ecology and the Ideology of Black Civic Elites." in Renewing Black Intellectual History (Routledge, 2015) pp. 126-157.

 Spaulding, Norman W. History of Black oriented radio in Chicago, 1929-1963 (PhD disst. University of Illinois at Urbana-Champaign, 1981.
 Spear, Allan H. Black Chicago: The making of a Negro ghetto, 1890–1920 (University of Chicago Press, 1967). widely cited scholqrship

 Spinney, Robert G. City of big shoulders: A history of Chicago (Cornell University Press, 2020), broad scholarly survey
 Street, Paul. "The 'Best Union Members': Class, Race, Culture, and Black Worker Militancy in Chicago's Stockyards during the 1930s." Journal of American Ethnic History (2000): 18-49. online
 Street, Paul. "The logic and limits of 'plant loyalty': black workers, white labor, and corporate racial paternalism in Chicago's stockyards, 1916-1940." Journal of social history (1996): 659-681.online
 Todd-Breland, Elizabeth. A political education: Black politics and education reform in Chicago since the 1960s (UNC Press Books, 2018).

 Tuttle Jr, William M. "Labor conflict and racial violence: The black worker in Chicago, 1894–1919." Labor History 10.3 (1969): 408–432.
 Tuttle, William M. Race Riot: Chicago in the Red Summer of 1919 (1970).
 Weems Jr, Robert E. The Merchant Prince of Black Chicago: Anthony Overton and the Building of a Financial Empire (U  of Illinois Press, 2020).
 West, E. James. A House for the Struggle: The Black Press and the Built Environment in Chicago ( U of Illinois Press, 2022).

Primary sources
The Chicago Commission on Race Relations. The Negro in Chicago. (Chicago; University of Chicago Press, 1922).
 Johnson, John H. Succeeding Against the Odds: The Autobiography of a Great American Businessman (1989) about John H. Johnson.

External links
 African-American History Tour for the City of Chicago
 Chicago's Black Metropolis: Understanding History Through a Historic Place, a National Park Service Teaching with Historic Places (TwHP) lesson plan
African Americans in Chicago
https://www.nytimes.com/2020/02/16/us/black-families-leaving-chicago.html
https://greatcities.uic.edu/wp-content/uploads/2019/08/Black-Population-Loss-in-Chicago.pdf
https://www.oxfordbibliographies.com/display/document/obo-9780190280024/obo-9780190280024-0103.xml

 
African Americans
African American